Bardeh Sefid or Bardeh Safid may refer to:
 Bardeh Sefid, Divandarreh
 Bardeh Sefid, Marivan